The S&P 500 Dividend Aristocrats is a stock market index composed of the companies in the S&P 500 index that have increased their dividends in each of the past 25 consecutive years. It was launched in May 2005.

There are other indexes of dividend aristocrats that vary with respect to market cap and minimum duration of consecutive yearly dividend increases.

Components are added when they reach the 25-year threshold and are removed when they fail to increase their dividend during a calendar year or are removed from the S&P 500. However, a study found that the stock performance of companies improves after they are removed from the index.

The index has been recommended as an alternative to bonds for investors looking to generate income.

Components
There are 66 companies in the index.

Components history
The following are the changes to the components of the index since 2008:

In 2023, three companies were added to the list: CH Robinson Worldwide (CHRW), Nordson (NDSN), and J.M. Smucker (SJM); and VF Corporation (VFC) announced a cut to its dividend in February; leaving 66 Dividend Aristocrats.

In 2022, two companies were added to the index: Brown & Brown, Inc. (BRO) and Church & Dwight Co., Inc. (CHD). AT&T Inc. (T) was removed due to its dividend cut and People's United Financial, Inc. (PBCT) was removed when its merger with M&T Bank Corporation was finalized.

In 2021, there were three additions to the index: IBM (IBM), NextEra Energy (NEE) and West Pharmaceutical Services (WST). Five companies were removed from the index: Raytheon (RTX), Carrier Global (CARR), Otis Worldwide (OTIS), Stryker Corporation (SYK) and Leggett & Platt (LEG), which was removed when it moved from the S&P 500 to the S&P MidCap 400.

In 2020, there were 7 additions: Amcor (AMCR), Atmos Energy (ATO), Realty Income Corporation (O), Essex Property Trust (ESS), Ross Stores (ROST), Albemarle Corporation (ALB), and Expeditors International (EXPD) were added to the list effective prior to market open on February 3. United Technologies was renamed Raytheon Technologies after divestment of some divisions and remained in the index. Both spinoffs Carrier Global (CARR) and Otis Worldwide (OTIS) were added to the index effective prior to the market opening on April 3, 2020.Removals in 2020: Ross Stores (ROST) and Helmerich & Payne (HP).
Ross Stores suspended its dividend on May 21 due to the COVID-19 pandemic and was removed from the index prior to market open on July 1, 2020

In 2019, Chubb Limited (CB), People's United Financial (PBCT), Caterpillar Inc. (CAT), and United Technologies (UTX) were added to the index.

In 2016, Chubb Corp (CB) was removed upon acquisition by ACE Limited (ACE).

In 2015, Family Dollar Stores (FDO) was removed from the index due to its purchase by Dollar Tree. Sigma-Aldrich (SIAL) was removed from the list due to its acquisition by Merck Group.

In 2014, Bemis (BMS) was removed from the S&P 500 index and therefore removed from the index.

In 2013, Pitney Bowes (PBI) was removed after slashing the dividend from 37.5c to 18.75c per quarter per share.

In 2012, CenturyLink (CTL) was removed from the index. The following 9 companies were added to the index: AT&T (T), Colgate-Palmolive (CL), Franklin Templeton Investments (BEN), Genuine Parts Company (GPC), Health Care Property Investors (HCP), Illinois Tool Works (ITW), Medtronic (MDT), Sysco (SYY), and T. Rowe Price (TROW).

In 2011, Ecolab (ECL), Hormel Foods (HRL), and McCormick & Company (MKC) were added.

In 2010, ten companies were removed from the index: Avery Dennison (AVY), BB&T (BBT), Gannett (GCI), General Electric (GE), Johnson Controls (JCI), Legg Mason (LM), M&T Bank (MTB), Pfizer (PFE), State Street Bank (STT), and U.S. Bancorp (USB). Brown Forman (BF.B) was added.

In 2009, 9 companies were removed from the index: Anheuser Busch (BUD), Bank of America (BAC), Comerica (CMA), Fifth Third Bank (FITB), Keycorp (KEY), Progressive Corp (PGR), Regions Financial (RF), Synovus Financial (SNV), and Wrigley Company (WW), which was acquired by Mars, Incorporated. There were two additions: Bemis Company (BMS) and Leggett & Platt (LEG).

In 2008, the index contained 52 companies.

References

External links
 

American stock market indices
S&P Dow Jones Indices